Guidonia Montecelio, commonly known as Guidonia, is a town and comune in the Metropolitan City of Rome Capital, Lazio, central Italy.

Geography
The municipality of Guidonia Montecelio, formed by the main towns of Guidonia and Montecelio, lies to the north-east of Rome, some kilometres from the Grande Raccordo Anulare - a ring-shaped motorway which forms a circle around the capital. The terrain of Guidonia Montecelio is mainly flat, and the community lies in between the Via Nomentana and the Via Tiburtina.

It borders with Fonte Nuova, Marcellina, Palombara Sabina, Rome, San Polo dei Cavalieri, Sant'Angelo Romano and Tivoli. The hamlets (frazioni) are Albuccione, Bivio di Guidonia, Colle Fiorito, Colleverde, La Botte, Marco Simone, Montecelio, Pichini, Setteville, Setteville Nord, Villalba and Villanova.

History
Montecelio was founded in 998 as a fortified castrum (Castrum Monticellorum).

In 1915 the Regio Esercito (Italian Royal Army) built a major military airport in the area for its Corpo Aeronautico Militare (Military Aviation Corps), the predecessor of the Italian Royal Air Force founded in 1923.

Guidonia was erected as a comune in 1937 by Benito Mussolini, its name chosen to honour the Regia Aeronautica general Alessandro Guidoni (1880–1928), who had died on 27 April 1928 while testing a new parachute at the air force facilities.

Economy

Today the town is part of the Rome metropolitan area, with a massive presence of industry (mainly travertine caves and cement industry) and the service sector. The number of residents commuting to Rome is high, with transport in a critical situation.

Guidonia is also home to Marco Simone Golf and Country Club, which was announced as the host of the 2022 Ryder Cup in June 2015, but with the COVID-19 pandemic postponing the 2020 Ryder Cup to 2021, subsequent matches were pushed back a year with Marco Simone now hosting the event in 2023.

People
David Di Michele - Football pl payer
Mikeshowsha - Italian Youtuber

International relations

 
Guidonia Montecelio is twinned with:
 Kawasaki, Japan
 Cape Canaveral, United States.
 Kashira, Russia

References

External links

Local portal
News & Info from Guidonia Montecelio
Guidonia Montecelio

Cities and towns in Lazio
Italian fascist architecture